Subur Parthasarathy (1911 – 10 October 1966), born Subur Mugaseth, was an Indian educator and legislator. She was the first principal at Ethiraj College for Women, and served in the upper house of the Indian Parliament from 1960 to 1966.

Early life 
Subur Mugaseth was born in Calicut, the daughter of Khodadad Mugaseth, into a family prominent in the city's Parsi community. Her only brother died in World War II. She attended the University of Madras and University of Oxford, and earned a master's degree in English, and completed a doctorate in 1936.

Career 
Parthasarathy taught English at Queen Mary's College in Madras. She was the first principal of Ethiraj College for Women, serving from 1948 to 1952. She was succeeded in the principalship by Mona Hensman. In 1952, she traveled in the United States studying universities and colleges. Parthasarathy was elected to the Rajya Sabha from 1960 to 1966.

Personal life 
In 1939, Subur Mugaseth married journalist and diplomat Gopalaswami Parthasarathy, after they met at Oxford. They had a son, Ashok Parthasarathy (1940–2019) who followed his parents into government work and academia. She died from heart and kidney ailments in New York, in 1966, while her husband was representing India at the United Nations.

Actor and playwright Girish Karnad was her niece's husband; and journalist Raghu Karnad is her grand-nephew.

References 

1911 births
1966 deaths
Parsi people
Indian educators
People from Kozhikode
Rajya Sabha members from Tamil Nadu
Women members of the Rajya Sabha
20th-century Indian women politicians
20th-century Indian politicians